The Kingdom of Sophene, was a Hellenistic-era political entity situated between ancient Armenia and Syria. Ruled by the Orontid dynasty, the kingdom was culturally mixed with Greek, Armenian, Iranian, Syrian, Anatolian and Roman influences. Founded around the 3rd century BCE, the kingdom maintained independence until  when the Artaxiad king Tigranes the Great conquered the territories as part of his empire. Sophene laid near medieval Kharput, which is present day Elazığ.

Name 
The name Sophene is thought to derive from the ethnonym Ṣuppani, a people who lived in the region in the first half of the 1st millennium BCE and appear in Hittite and Assyrian sources. According to historian Nicholas Adontz, the Ancient Greek Sōphēnḗ was coined after the Armenian Tsopʻkʻ, which stems directly from Ṣuppani.

History 
The Kingdom of Sophene was ruled by the Orontid dynasty of Iranian origin, which was descended from Orontes I, a Bactrian nobleman who was the son-in-law of the Achaemenid King of Kings Artaxerxes II. According to the Greek writer Strabo (died 24 AD) in his Geographica, Sophene first emerged as a distinct kingdom under Zariadres, who was installed as its ruler by the Seleucid king Antiochus III the Great. He further adds that following the defeat of Antiochus III against the Romans, Zariadres declared independence. However this report is strongly contradicted by epigraphic and numismatic evidence.

Sophene most likely emerged as distinct kingdom in the 3rd-century BC, during the gradual decline of Seleucid influence in the Near East and the split of the Orontid dynasty into several branches. Three rulers belonging to a different Orontid branch, Sames I, Arsames I and Xerxes ruled the western part of Greater Armenia, perhaps from Commagene to Arzanene. Following the death of Zariadres, his son Artaxias I claimed the right to rule over Sophene based on his succession rights (primogeniture). However, the younger line in Sophene managed to preserve the independence of their kingdom, due to their diplomatic (and possibly dynastic) link with Cappadocia. Three known successors of Zariadres are known, which were Mithrobouzanes, Arkathias, and Arsakes.

The kingdom's capital was Carcathiocerta, identified as the now abandoned town-site of Egil on the Tigris river north of Diyarbakir. However, its largest settlement and only true city was Arsamosata, located further to the north. Arsamosata was founded in the 3rd century BCE and survived in a contracted state until perhaps the early 13th century CE.

Sophene was autonomous for the majority of the 2nd-century BC. Change first occurred with the arrival of the Parthian Empire, who under the King of Kings Mithridates II forced Sophene to recognize their suzerainty. Sophene was conquered by the King of Greater Armenia, Tigranes II the Great c. 95 BCE, but Tigranes lost control over Sophene c. 69 BCE during his war with Rome. After Tigranes II was defeated by the Romans, Pompey installed Tigranes' son Tigranes the Younger as ruler of Sophene, then ceded the kingdom to Ariobarzanes I of Cappadocia. It is debated whether after 66 BCE Sophene came back under Greater Armenian control or became a part of Cappadocia. Around 54 CE, the Romans installed Sohaemus of Emesa as King of Sophene. After this, Sophene reverted to Armenian control and was ruled as an Armenian province. Branches of the Orontid dynasty continued to rule parts of Sophene after it was annexed by Greater Armenia.

Religion and culture 
The Orontid dynasty in Sophene practiced Zoroastrianism. According to modern historian Michał Marciak, the well-attested existence of Iranian culture in Sophene could be understood as a derivation of Greater Armenia and indirectly from Iran. However, he also adds that the strong existence of Iranian culture might have influenced Roman and Greek writers to regard the region as Armenian. The Orontids were involved or revived certain local practices of their Persian satrapal descendants to make their small realm stand out. Furthermore, with the names of the royal members of the family including the names of their newfound cities, the Orontids emphasized their Achaemenid and Orontid royal dynastic aspirations, and also their Iranian cultural background. This included names such as Xerxes and Arsames, common amongst the Achaemenid dynasty and the Persian elite. The name of "Sames" is possibly derived from the Avestan name Sāma, the father of the Avestan hero Garshasp, which would indicate some sort of custom of Iranian religious or epic lore amongst the Orontids.

Iranian cults were popular in Sophene amongst the nobility, who gave themselves theophoric Iranian names, and the peasantry, who sacrificed horses in the name of the goddess Anahita. Anahita was highly popular in the country, with animals such as cows and horses being regularly sacrificed in her name. The coins minted in Sophene depicted several figures, such as Herakles, winged thunderbolts and eagles. The iconography of Herakles may have been used as a representation of the Zoroastrian gods Verethragna or Ahura Mazda, similar to the Parthian Empire.

Architecture 
The Orontids founded cities such as Samosata and Arsamosata. They were named the "joy of" or "happiness of", which was a Orontid (and later Artaxiad) practice that recalled the Achaemenid royal discourse. Although the settlements founded by the Orontids demonstrate their Persian cultural and dynastic connection, they did not reuse Achaemenid or Seleucid sites.

The royal tombs erected by the Orontids played a role in the evolution of several Middle Iranian traditions. They created them in the style of a rock-cut tomb, thus greatly stressing their Persian royal connection, as well as recalling the stories of the Achaemenid necropolis near Persepolis.

Coinage 
Similar to the early Arsacids of Parthia and Frataraka of Persis, the Orontids of Sophene experimented with images of Iranian royal power. On his coins, Sames I is shown as clean-shaven and wearing the kyrbasia, a type of headgear originally worn by the satraps of the Achaemenid Empire. The tip of Sames' kyrbasia is more prominent, similar to that of the headgear worn by the early Ariarathids of Cappadocia. On the coins of Xerxes, he is shown bearded and wearing a diademed kyrbasia, which represented a new imagery of Iranian royal power.

Language 
Armenian was the common language spoken by the people of Sophene. However, Imperial Aramaic (with a fairly strong admixture of Persian terms), was used in governmental and court proceedings, which was rooted in Achaemenid practices from Armenia.

Kings of Sophene 
 Sames I (ca. 260 BCE)
 Arsames I (ca. 240 BCE)
 Xerxes (ca. 220 BCE)
 Zariadres (ca. 190 BCE)
 Mithrobouzanes (ca. 188 BCE163 BCE)
 Arkathias (second half of the 2nd century BCE)
 Artanes (or Arsakes) (reign ended ca. 95 BCE)

References

Sources 
 
 
 
 
 
 
 
 
 
 
 

 
 
 
 
 
 
 
 
 
 

 
 Sophene
Seleucid Empire successor states
States and territories established in the 3rd century BC
Zoroastrianism